St Andrew's Cathedral, Namukozi is an Anglican cathedral in Uganda: the current diocesan is Stephen Kaziimba, Archbishop-designate of Uganda

References

Anglican cathedrals in Uganda